Paul He Zeqing (born March 1968) is a Chinese Roman Catholic Bishop of Roman Catholic Diocese of Sichuan, China.

Biography
He was born in 1968 in Wanzhou District of Chongqing. He was ordained a priest on November 30, 1993. He was ordained bishop of the Roman Catholic Diocese of Wanxian in 2008. In 2016 he was elected vice president of the Bishops Conference of Catholic Church in China (BCCCC).

References

1968 births
Sichuanese Roman Catholics
People from Chongqing
Living people
21st-century Roman Catholic bishops in China